Handan (579) is a Type 054A frigate of the People's Liberation Army Navy. She was commissioned on 16 August 2018.

Development and design 

The Type 054A carries HQ-16 medium-range air defence missiles and anti-submarine missiles in a vertical launching system (VLS) system. The HQ-16 has a range of up to 50 km, with superior range and engagement angles to the Type 054's HQ-7. The Type 054A's VLS uses a hot launch method; a shared common exhaust system is sited between the two rows of rectangular launching tubes.

The four AK-630 close-in weapon systems (CIWS) of the Type 054 were replaced with two Type 730 CIWS on the Type 054A. The autonomous Type 730 provides improved reaction time against close-in threats.

Construction and career 
Handan was launched on 26 July 2014 at the China State Shipbuilding Corporation in Shanghai. Commissioned on 16 August 2018.

On 17 January 2019, Dongpinghu, Wuhu and Handan made a goodwill visit to Manila.

Gallery

References 

2014 ships
Ships built in China
Type 054 frigates